The Sisters of Our Lady of Refuge in Mount Cavalry (Latin: Sororum Dominae Nostrae a Refugio in Monte Calvario) are a religious congregation founded in 1631 in Genoa by Virginia Centurione Bracelli.

Catholic female orders and societies
1631 establishments in the Republic of Genoa